In enzymology, a sterol 14-demethylase is an enzyme of the Cytochrome P450 (CYP) superfamily. It is any member of the CYP51 family. It catalyzes a chemical reaction such as:

obtusifoliol + 3 O2 + 3 NADPH + 3 H+  4alpha-methyl-5alpha-ergosta-8,14,24(28)-trien-3beta-ol + formate + 3 NADP+ + 4 H2O

The 4 substrates here are obtusifoliol, O2, NADPH, and H+, whereas its 4 products are 4alpha-methyl-5alpha-ergosta-8,14,24(28)-trien-3beta-ol, formate, NADP+, and H2O.

Although the lanosterol 14α-demethylase is present in a wide variety of organisms, the enzyme is studied primarily in the context of fungi, where it plays an essential role in mediating membrane permeability. In fungi, CYP51 catalyzes the demethylation of lanosterol to create an important precursor that is eventually converted into ergosterol. This steroid then makes its way throughout the cell, where it alters the permeability and rigidity of plasma membranes much as cholesterol does in animals. Because ergosterol constitutes a fundamental component of fungal membranes, many antifungal medications have been developed to inhibit 14α-demethylase activity and prevent the production of this key compound.

Nomenclature 

This enzyme belongs to the family of oxidoreductases, specifically those acting on paired donors, with O2 as oxidant and incorporation or reduction of oxygen. The oxygen incorporated need not be derived from O2 with NADH or NADPH as one donor, and incorporation of one atom o oxygen into the other donor.  The systematic name of this enzyme class is sterol,NADPH:oxygen oxidoreductase (14-methyl cleaving). Other names in common use include obtusufoliol 14-demethylase, lanosterol 14-demethylase, lanosterol 14alpha-demethylase, and sterol 14alpha-demethylase.  This enzyme participates in biosynthesis of steroids.

These are not the typical CYP subfamilies, but only one subfamily is created for each major taxonomic group. CYP51A for Animals, CYP51B for Bacteria. CYP51C for Chromista, CYP51D for Dictyostelium, CYP51E for Euglenozoa, CYP51F for Fungi. Those groups with only one CYP51 per species are all called by one name: CYP51A1 is for all animal CYP51s since they are orthologous. The same is true for CYP51B, C, D, E and F. CYP51G (green plants) and CYP51Hs (monocots only so far) have individual sequence numbers.

Function 
The biological role of this protein is also well understood. The demethylated products of the CYP51 reaction are vital intermediates in pathways leading to the formation of cholesterol in humans, ergosterol in fungi, and other types of sterols in plants. These sterols localize to the plasma membrane of cells, where they play an important structural role in the regulation of membrane fluidity and permeability and also influence the activity of enzymes, ion channels, and other cell components that are embedded within. With the proliferation of immuno-suppressive diseases such as HIV/AIDS and cancer, patients have become increasingly vulnerable to opportunistic fungal infections (Richardson et al.). Seeking new means to treat such infections, drug researchers have begun targeting the 14α-demethylase enzyme in fungi; destroying the fungal cell's ability to produce ergosterol causes a disruption of the plasma membrane, thereby resulting in cellular leakage and ultimately the death of the pathogen (DrugBank).

Azoles are currently the most popular class of antifungals used in both agricultural and medical settings. These compounds bind as the sixth ligand to the heme group in CYP51, thereby altering the structure of the active site and acting as noncompetitive inhibitors. The effectiveness of imidazoles and triazoles (common azole subclasses) as inhibitors of 14α-demethylase have been confirmed through several experiments. Some studies test for changes in the production of important downstream ergosterol intermediates in the presence of these compounds. Other studies employ spectrophotometry to quantify azole-CYP51 interactions. Coordination of azoles to the prosthetic heme group in the enzyme's active site causes a characteristic shift in CYP51 absorbance, creating what is commonly referred to as a type II difference spectrum.

Prolonged use of azoles as antifungals has resulted in the emergence of drug resistance among certain fungal strains. Mutations in the coding region of CYP51 genes, overexpression of CYP51, and overexpression of membrane efflux transporters can all lead to resistance to these antifungals. Consequently, the focus of azole research is beginning to shift towards identifying new ways to circumvent this major obstacle.

Structure 

References

Further reading 

 
 
 
 

EC 1.14.13
NADPH-dependent enzymes
Enzymes of known structure